Voprosy Ekonomiki (Russian: Вопросы экономики, translation: Economic Questions) is a Russian theoretical and peer-reviewed academic journal for economic studies. It is published monthly by the Institute of Economics of the Russian Academy of Sciences. It was founded during the Soviet era as Problems of Economics.

The main sections of the journal are: economic theory; professional analysis of the course of economic transformations in Russia; monetary, investment and structural policy; social sphere; regional economy; analytical and statistical information on the state of various industries and market sectors; enterprise economics, problems of ownership, corporate governance, small business; world economy; economic history, etc.

The journal was awarded the Order of the Red Banner of Labor (1979). The editorial office of the journal is located in Moscow.

References

Economics journals
Russian-language journals

Publications established in 1929